Aaron Keith Wildig (born 15 April 1992) is an English professional footballer who plays as a midfielder for Newport County.

Club career

Cardiff City
Wildig was born in Hereford, and began his career at Cardiff City, making his way through the club's youth system, including captaining the under-18 side. In April 2009, Wildig signed a professional contract at the club, before going on to make his professional debut at the start of the 2009–10 season, replacing Miguel Comminges during a 3–1 win over Dagenham & Redbridge in the first round of the League Cup on 11 August. He made two more appearances in the competition for Cardiff, in the second round win over Bristol Rovers and the third round defeat to Aston Villa. His league debut came nearly three months later when he replaced Riccardo Scimeca at half time during a 2–0 win over West Bromwich Albion on 8 December. He made his first start on 12 January 2010 in the FA Cup tie with rivals Bristol City, and then made his first league start on 16 January against Scunthorpe United. During his next league appearance, Wildig scored the first professional goal of his career during a 5–1 defeat to Newcastle United.

He moved on loan to Scottish Premier League club Hamilton Academical on 25 January 2011 until the end of the season. He made his debut 4 days later in a 1–1 draw with Kilmarock and made 3 more appearances before returning at the end of the season.

On 8 November 2011, he joined League Two side Shrewsbury Town on a loan. He made his debut for the club on 12 November, in a FA Cup match against Newport County. He scored his first goal on 19 November, in a 7–2 win over Northampton Town, however he suffered an ankle injury in the following game, which kept him out for the rest of the month. He extended his loan by an extra month on 8 December. On 17 January 2012, Wildig extended the loan again till the end of the season. Following a late season surge in form, he impressed Shrewsbury boss Graham Turner and following the club's promotion to League One, Turner offered Wildig a contract at Shrewsbury.

On 21 May 2012, Wildig was released by Cardiff along with six of his fellow players. He had spent a total of four years at the club, but he was not part of the future plans of new manager Malky Mackay.

Shrewsbury Town
On 29 May 2012, Wildig agreed a deal to join Shrewsbury Town on a free transfer. He made his debut as a contracted Shrewsbury player on 11 August 2012, in a League Cup match against Leeds United, where he was a substitute for fellow former Cardiff City player Joe Jacobson. He went on to make 21 league appearances that season, scoring once against Bury.

Wildig signed a one-year contract extension on 21 May 2013, and by playing an unspecified number of matches the following season triggered a clause to extend his contract for a further year. However, he went on loan to Kidderminster Harriers in January 2015 having not featured for Shrewsbury that season so far under new manager Micky Mellon.

Following the expiry of his loan, he returned to Shrewsbury Town, finally making his first appearance of the season, coming on as a substitute for Keith Southern in the 2–1 home defeat against Northampton Town. He then joined Morecambe on loan in March 2015.

It was announced on 8 May 2015 that Wildig would be released at the end of the season when his Shrewsbury contract expired.

Morecambe
Wildig joined former loan club Morecambe on a two-year contract on 6 June 2015. He signed a new one-year contract in June 2019.

Newport County
After turning down a new contract with Morecambe, Newport County announced the signing of Wildig on 6 June 2022. He made his debut for Newport on 30 July 2022 in the starting line up for the 1-1 League Two draw against Sutton United.  Wildig scored his first goal for Newport on 24 August 2022 in the 3-2 EFL Cup second round win against Portsmouth.

International career
Despite being born in England, Wildig instead chose to play for Wales and represented the Under-16 side. It was later discovered, however, that Wildig did not qualify for Wales as his only Welsh relative is a great-great-great grandfather and the international ruling on familial linkage only allows qualification through a parent or grandparent.

Career statistics

Club

Honours
Shrewsbury Town
EFL League Two runner-up: 2011–12

Morecambe
EFL League Two play-off winner: 2020–21

References

External links

1992 births
Living people
Sportspeople from Hereford
English footballers
Welsh footballers
Wales youth international footballers
Association football midfielders
Cardiff City F.C. players
Hamilton Academical F.C. players
Shrewsbury Town F.C. players
Kidderminster Harriers F.C. players
Morecambe F.C. players
Newport County A.F.C. players
English Football League players
Scottish Premier League players